Zinovyev is a rural locality (a khutor) in Mikhaylovka Urban Okrug, Volgograd Oblast, Russia. The population was 90 as of 2010. There are 3 streets.

Geography 
Zinovyev is located 35 km southwest of Mikhaylovka. Senichkin is the nearest rural locality.

References 

Rural localities in Mikhaylovka urban okrug